The Paradelta Ben Hur is an Italian single-place paraglider that was designed and produced by Paradelta Parma of Parma. It is now out of production.

Design and development
The Ben Hur was designed as an advanced and competition glider. The models are each named for their relative size.

Variants
Ben Hur T5° dm
Small-sized model for lighter pilots.
Ben Hur T5° dg
Mid-sized model for medium-weight pilots.
Ben Hur T5° de
Large-sized model for heavier pilots.

Specifications (Ben Hur T5° dg)

References

Ben Hur
Paragliders